Bridges is a rural locality in the Sunshine Coast Region, Queensland, Australia. In the  Bridges had a population of 276 people.

Geography 
The locality is bounded to the south-east by the North Maroochy River.

The Bruce Highway enters the suburb from the south-east (Yandina) and travels north through the locality, close to its north-eastern boundary before exiting to the north-east (North Arm). The North Coast railway line also enters the suburb from the south-east (Yandina) slightly west of the highway and travels north through the locality, crossing the highway and running immediately parallel and east of the highway, forming the north-eastern boundary of the locality, before exiting to the north-east (North Arm). Bridges railway station once served the locality but it is now abandoned.

The land use is a mixture of rural residential, grazing on native vegetation, and crop growing.

History
The locality takes its name from the Bridges railway station  which was namenamed after Sir William Throsby Bridges, the Commander of the First Australian Imperial Force in 1914.

In the  Bridges had a population of 276 people.

Education 
There are no schools in Bridges. The nearest government primary schools are Yandina State School in neighbouring Yandina to the south and North Arm State School in neighbouring North Arm to the north-east. The nearest government secondary school is Nambour State College in Nambour to the south.

Amenities 
Parks in the locality include:

 Endiandra Park
 Endiandra Park Bushland Conservation Reserve

References

Further reading 

 
 

Suburbs of the Sunshine Coast Region
Localities in Queensland